Paul Graeffe (11 April 1897 in Brussels – 11 March 1957) was a Belgian bobsledder who competed in the 1930s. He finished fifth in the four-man event at the 1936 Winter Olympics in Garmisch-Partenkirchen.

References
1936 bobsleigh four-man results
1936 Olympic Winter Games official report - p. 414.
Paul Graeffe's profile at Sports Reference.com

Sportspeople from Brussels
Olympic bobsledders of Belgium
Belgian male bobsledders
Bobsledders at the 1936 Winter Olympics
1897 births
1957 deaths